Gérard Briend (born 26 March 1947) is a French racing cyclist. He rode in the 1972 Tour de France.

References

1947 births
Living people
French male cyclists
Place of birth missing (living people)